The Road Runners Club is an association of road runners formed in 1952 to encourage the athletic discipline of road running in the United Kingdom. Since then it has developed into a club that embraces the concept of assisting in the promotion of and training for road races and long distance track races. The most popular distances amongst current members are the half marathon and marathon for which much training advice is available to members. The club operates a unique club championship whereby members send in the verifiable results from any sanctioned race in the world and the results are entered throughout a calendar year. This has proved popular amongst all levels of ability and resulted in 280 championship entries for 2019. The club now embraces all runners from the park run to the marathon and ultra marathon competitors with comprehensive advice on its website.
 Members are spread around the world with even some in Australia and many find the website a valuable source of information on the practical issues of training.

History
The RRC was founded under the leadership of Ernest Neville (1883–1972) as a result of the success of the London to Brighton road running race he had organised, and which took place on August 11, 1951 as part of the Festival of Britain celebrations. Ernest had a lot of previous experience of organising Road 'Walking' races from London to Brighton and was just as passionate about 'Road Running'.

The second London to Brighton Race was staged in 1952 and became an annual event until 2005 when organisational difficulties prevented its continuation on public roads. The exact distance varied over the years from 52 miles 694 yards to 55 miles due to road and course changes. Its "sister" race, the Comrades of South Africa, held over a similar distance, pre-dates RRC London to Brighton race (first race 1921), and continues to this day.

The main trophies at the London to Brighton race were the Arthur Newton trophy (named after another RRC founding member) for the winner and, for the first winning team, the "Len Hurst" belt (which had previously been won by the well-known pedestrian runner of the late 19th and early 20th Century), donated by his wife to the RRC.

In addition to the London to Brighton race the RRC has organised and sponsored various long distance track races when numerous records were set. These included 24-hour and 50-mile track races. Amongst the 100-mile track races were the following:
100-mile track World Best (11:38:54) - Cavin Woodward, October 1975, Tipton near Birmingham
100-mile track World Best (11:30:51) - Don Ritchie, October 1977, Crystal Palace, London
100-mile track World Best (11:28:03) - Oleg Kharitanov, October 2002, Crystal Palace, London

The club's success resulted in similar organisations being established elsewhere in the world, in particular the Road Runners Club of America, and RRCs in India, Korea, New Zealand and South Africa.

The club's badge was designed by a Harold Murrells and is based on the symbol for the Greek element air.

The RRC was important in developing accurate course measurement and procedures for the correct organisation of long distance Road and Track races. Both were pioneered by the late John Jewell.  He is still acknowledged as a leading pioneer in this field by certified course measurers around the world.   The race procedures he formulated are still also the basics with which races are organised worldwide.

John Jewell also initiated a "Standards Scheme" whereby members are awarded certificates for achieving set times over a range of distances. Over the years the scheme has been extended to include times for women and for Masters.
John Trory, the general secretary since 2014, has introduced a unique form of championship where members compete in any officially measured and timed race in the world and enter their times in the annual competition which runs for a calendar year. Custom designed medals are awarded for first 3 places in each age and distance category and a large cup is awarded to the club's overall champion, being the member who acquired during the year the highest age graded percentage.

Structure
The club's constitution states that the management of the club be vested in a council whose members are:
President
Past Presidents
Up to 30 Vice-Presidents
Honorary General Secretary
Honorary Treasurer
and up to 30 other members

Past Presidents

Membership
Originally, only those (men) who were already members of running clubs affiliated to the National Governing Body of their own country were eligible to join the RRC (overseas members being allowed). Since the 1980s membership has been open to all men and women. There are currently (2019) around 675 members. The annual membership fee of only £12.50 has been held for more than 10 years and there are no reported plans for increasing this.

Publications
Roadrunner magazine. Published three times per year, each issue being A4 full colour and approx. 40 pages.
Training For Ultras (1987, Revised edition published 2013. Various international level contributors, Edited by Andy Milroy) Available from Road Runners Club £10 plus postage

References

External links
  Facebook page accessed via website

Running clubs in the United Kingdom
1952 establishments in the United Kingdom